Nouhaila Arif is a Moroccan actress. She is best known for her role in Nabil Ayouch's 2021 film Casablanca Beats (French: Haut et Fort), which was selected to compete for the Palme d'Or at the 2021 Cannes Film Festival.

References

External links 
 

Moroccan film actresses
Year of birth missing (living people)
Living people